George Hill was an American football coach who worked as an assistant in college football and in the National Football League.  He was the defensive coordinator of the Miami Dolphins from 1996 to 1999. Prior to that, he served as the team's linebacker coach under Don Shula. Hill was defensive coordinator for the Indianapolis Colts from 1985 to 1988 under Rod Dowhower and Ron Meyer

Miami Dolphins
As the defensive coordinator for the Miami Dolphins, Hill developed the talents of players such as linebacker Zach Thomas, cornerback Sam Madison, defensive end Jason Taylor, and cornerback Terrell Buckley.  In 1996 his defense ranked seventh in rushing yards allowed.  The next season, 1997, they finished fourth in rushing touchdowns allowed.  In 1998 his defense has its best season as they finished first in points allowed.  Madison and Buckley each finished with eight interceptions.  Trace Armstrong finished with 10.5 sacks and Taylor finished with nine sacks.  Lorenzo Bromell totaled eight sacks.  In 1999 the Dolphins finished fifth in passing yards allowed and eight in rushing yards allowed.

References

Year of birth missing (living people)
Living people
Cornell Big Red football coaches
Denison Big Red football coaches
Duke Blue Devils football coaches
Indianapolis Colts coaches
Miami Dolphins coaches
National Football League defensive coordinators
Ohio State Buckeyes football coaches